Abdul Qavi Desnavi (1 November 1930 –  7 July 2011) was an Indian Urdu language writer, critic, bibliographer and linguist. He wrote many books on Urdu literature. His works included about Maulana Abul Kalam Azad, Mirza Ghalib and Allama Muhammad Iqbal. He was awarded with several awards for his literary works.

Early life

Desnavi was born in village Desna of block Asthawan in Nalanda district Bihar. to the family of 
Muslim scholar Sulaiman Nadvi, who claimed to be descended from and who was a recognized historian and biographer of Muhammad. Desnavi was the son of Syed Mohammed Saeed Raza, who was Professor of Urdu, Arabic and Persian languages in St. Xavier's College, Mumbai. Desnavi had two brothers, elder Prof. Syed Mohi Raza and younger Syed Abdul Wali Desnavi.

Many scholars, poets, and teachers of today were his students in Bhopal, and several other students obtained PhD degree under his guidance. He died on 7 July 2011 in Bhopal, India.

Career 

Desnavi got his primary education in Arrah town of Bihar state. He completed his Graduation and Post Graduation in First from St. Xavier's College, Mumbai. He joined Urdu department in Saifia Post Graduate College in February 1961. He became Professor and Head of the Urdu department of Saifia College. He was a well known literary figure in India and in the Urdu world.

He has over 50 books under his name, some of which are:

 Bhopal aur Ghalib
 Motala-E-Khotoot Ghalib
 Talesh-E_Azad
 Ek Shahar Panch Mashahirs
 Hayat-e-Abul Kalam Azad

Bibliography
 Allama Iqbal Bhopal Mein, publisher, Dept. of Urdu Saifia College,Bhopal (1967)
 Bhopal Aur Ghalib, publisher, Dept. of Urdu Saifia College,Bhopal (1969)
 Nuskha-E-Bhopal Aur Nuskha-A-Bhopal Sani, publisher, Dept. of Urdu Saifia College,Bhopal (1970)
 Motala—E—Khotoot—E—Ghalib (1975) (2nd edition) (1979)
 Iqbal Uneesween Sadi Mein, publisher, Naseem Book Depot, (1977)
 Iqbal Aur Dilli, Publisher Nai Awaz Jamia Nagar New Delhi (1978)
 Iqbal Aur Darul Iqbal Bhopal, publisher, Naseem Book Depot, (1983)
 Iqbaliat Ki Talash, Makataba Jamia, (1984)
 Iqbaliat Ki Talash, publisher, Globe Publishers, Urdu Bazar Lahore, Pakistan (1985)
 Abul Kalam Azad Urdu, Publisher Sahitya Akademi (1987)
 Maulana Abul Kalam Mohiuddin Ahmad Azad Dehlavi (1988)
 Talash—E—Azad, publisher, Maharashtra Urdu Academy
 Hayat Abul Kalam Azad (2000),Publisher, Modern Publishing House New Delhi.

Legacy 
On 1 November 2017, Google showed a Google Doodle in honouring Desnavi's 87th birthday.

See also
List of Indian writers
List of Urdu language writers

References

External links 
 Photographs 
 At the Indian National Library
 Bibliographic detail

1930 births
2011 deaths
20th-century Indian educational theorists
20th-century Indian linguists
Indian literary critics
20th-century Indian Muslims
Linguists of Urdu
St. Xavier's College, Mumbai alumni
Urdu-language writers from India
Scholars from Bihar
Writers from Bhopal